Bernard Dubourdieu (28 April 1773 – 13 March 1811) was a French rear-admiral who led the allied French-Venetian forces at the Battle of Lissa in 1811,  during which he was killed.

Life
A native of Bayonne, Dubourdieu started sailing on a merchantman at 16, before joining the Navy in 1792. He quickly rose to ensign aboard the Entreprenant. He transferred to the frigate Topaze the next year in Latouche-Tréville's squadron.

Captured at Toulon by the British and transferred to Gibraltar, he escaped to Lorient. Promoted to enseigne de vaisseau, Dubourdieu sailed on the corvette Gaieté. Gaieté was captured and Dubourdieu was imprisoned again until 1799.

Captured a third time in Alexandria in 1800, he was exchanged and promoted to lieutenant de vaisseau. In 1805, he was made a capitaine de frégate. In 1807, he took command of the frigate Pénélope and captured thirteen British merchantmen. In the action of 27 February 1809, along with the frigate Pauline, he captured  blockading Toulon.

On 23 October 1810, he raided Lissa and captured six ships in the harbour. He was then tasked to capture the island and establish a base there. Promoted to contre-amiral, Dubourdieu set sail with six frigates. In the ensuing Battle of Lissa, the French were routed and Dubourdieu was killed.

References

Bibliography

External links

1773 births
1811 deaths
People from Bayonne
French Navy admirals
French military personnel killed in the Napoleonic Wars
French naval commanders of the Napoleonic Wars